Spratt or Sprat may refer to:

Arts, entertainment and media
 "Jack Sprat", a nursery rhyme
 Jack Spratt (fictional detective), a character in novels by Jasper Fforde
 Septimus Spratt, a character in British television series Downton Abbey
 Dylan Spratt, US born Entrepreneur
 Thomas Abel Brimage Spratt, English hydrographer

Places
 Spratt, Michigan, United States
 Spratt, Ohio, United States

Other uses
 Sprat, group of forage fish belonging to the genus Sprattus in the family Clupeidae
 Spratt (surname)
 Spratt Cemetery, near Fort Mill, York County, South Carolina, United States
 Spratt Model 107, an American seaplane
 Spratt Stadium, St. Joseph, Missouri, United States
 Spratt's, an American pet food manufacturer
 Spratt's Complex, a mixed-use development in Poplar, London

See also
 Sea Spurge Remote Area Teams (SPRATS)
 Sproat
 Sprot (surname)